The National College of Engineering (Nepali: नेशनल अफ कलेज ईन्जिनियरिङ ) or NCE is a private college in Nepal. It is affiliated with Tribhuvan University (TU).

The college provides education at bachelor level in civil engineering, electrical engineering, computer engineering, and electronics, communication &  information engineering. This college is located at Talchhikhel, Lalitpur (near sathdobato chowk).

History 

The college was initiated by senior TU professors in 2001 and transferred to the present management team in 2008 . The team spent a year in managing the system to the admitted students in Civil, Electrical, Electronics and Communication and Computer studies in 2009.

References

Tribhuvan University
Engineering universities and colleges in Nepal
2001 establishments in Nepal